Mark Kinner (born 23 July 1952) is an American politician and a Republican member of the Wyoming House of Representatives representing District 29 since May 18, 2015. He was appointed to the seat after incumbent Representative John Patton died.

Elections

2015
Kinner was selected by the Sheridan County Commission to represent the 29th district after incumbent Republican Representative John Patton died. He took office May 18, 2015.

2016
Kinner faced Steven Cain in the Republican primary and defeated Cain with 64% of the vote. He then faced Democrat Sandra Kingsley in the general election, and defeated Kingsley with 77.6% of the vote.

References

External links
Official page at the Wyoming Legislature
Profile from Ballotpedia

1952 births
Living people
Republican Party members of the Wyoming House of Representatives
University of Wyoming alumni
Politicians from Danbury, Connecticut
People from Sheridan, Wyoming
21st-century American politicians